Coldstream railway station served the town of Coldstream in Berwickshire, Scotland although the station was across the River Tweed in Northumberland, England. The station was on both the Alnwick to Cornhill Branch which ran from Alnwick to Cornhill Junction on the Kelso line near Coldstream and the Kelso to Tweedmouth line.

History

The Cornhill Branch project was authorized in 1882 to link the farming communities of north Northumberland with the market town of Alnwick and link the North Eastern Railway's Kelso line to its Alnwick Branch. Construction started by the North Eastern Railway in 1884. The line had difficulty attracting passengers as many of the stations were some distance from the communities they served. Increased bus competition in the 1920s led to passenger trains being withdrawn on 22 September 1930, although the service resumed briefly during the Second World War to serve RAF Milfield near .

After a severe storm in August 1948 washed away a bridge north of Ilderton station, British Railwayswho had recently taken over the linedecided that the volume of traffic along the line did not warrant replacing it. This coupled with an infrequent service caused the line to go further into decline and the section from Alnwick to Ilderton closed on 2 March 1953 with the other section following suit on 29 March 1965.

On 15 June 1964 passenger services were withdrawn along the whole line between Tweedmouth and St Boswells. Freight services between Tweedmouth and Kelso followed suit the next year on 29 March with the complete closure of the line. Only one track of the double line between Kelso and Tweedmouth was initially lifted, but all track was removed in 1969 from St Boswells through to Tweedmouth following closure of the freight service to Kelso and complete closure of the Waverley Route.

Services

Present day

The station has been demolished and a housing estate occupies the site.

References

External links
 Coldstream Station on Disused Stations
 Coldstream Station on navigable O.S. map
 Pictures of possibly the last passenger train to Wooler at Coldstream station

Former North Eastern Railway (UK) stations
Disused railway stations in Northumberland
Railway stations in Great Britain opened in 1849
Railway stations in Great Britain closed in 1964
1849 establishments in Scotland